The Producers Guild of America Award for Outstanding Sports Program is an annual award given by the Producers Guild of America since 2011.

Winners and nominees

2010s

2020s

Total awards by network
 HBO – 7
 ESPN – 2
 Hulu – 1
 VICELAND – 1
 YouTube – 1

Programs with multiple awards
5 awards
 Real Sports with Bryant Gumbel (4 consecutive)

Programs with multiple nominations

11 nominations
 Real Sports with Bryant Gumbel

10 nominations
 Hard Knocks

5 nominations
 SportsCenter

3 nominations
 24/7
 E:30

2 nominations
 30 for 30
 Formula 1: Drive to Survive
 Monday Night Football
 The Fight Game with Jim Lampley
 VICE World of Sports

References

Sports Program